James McHale is an Australian journalist and news presenter.

Career
McHale graduated from Willetton Senior High School in 2001 and Murdoch University in 2006 with a Bachelor of Laws/Media, majoring in Radio. After completing his degree, he worked at Clayton Utz in 2007 and 2008.

In February 2009, McHale joined the Australian Broadcasting Corporation, where he worked as a reporter.

In December 2011, McHale replaced Karina Carvalho as presenter of the weekday bulletin of ABC News WA with Carvalho temporarily replacing Virginia Trioli whilst Trioli was on maternity leave on ABC News Breakfast.

In February 2013, McHale began presenting the national ABC News at Five bulletin on ABC TV.

McHale's last day at the ABC was 11 September 2020.

References

External links
 McHale's profile at ABC News

Living people
ABC News (Australia) presenters
Australian television journalists
Year of birth missing (living people)
Murdoch University alumni
Journalists from Western Australia